Teresa Reichlen (born ) is an American ballet dancer. She joined the New York City Ballet in 2001, was promoted to principal dancer in 2009, and retired in 2022.

Early life
Reichlen was born in Clifton, Virginia. She has three brothers. When she was three, her parents sent her to ballet classes. At age 10, she started training at Russell School of Ballet, in Northern Virginia. She is the first person from that academy accepted by the School of American Ballet, but she deferred for a year and then entered SAB in 1999, at age 15. During her deferral year, she attended a summer intensive session at the School of American Ballet and, afterward, stayed in New York City as a full-time student.

Career
In 2000, at age sixteen, Reichlen got an apprenticeship at the New York City Ballet. She thought she would join Pacific Northwest Ballet, which is known for hiring taller dancers, but ended up joining the corps de ballet the following year. At age 19, Reichlen danced the solo role in "Rubies" from Jewels. She was promoted to soloist in 2005. In 2009, at age 25, she became a principal dancer. She has danced lead roles in works by George Balanchine, Jerome Robbins, Justin Peck and Christopher Wheeldon.

In the 2004-05 season, Reichlen was the Janice Levin Dancer Honorees, which is given to promising corps members at the NYCB.

Reichlen had also performed with Wheeldon’s company, Morphoses, and Columbia Ballet Collaborative. In 2010, Reichlen performed in Cuba, alongside several other NYCB dancers.

In 2018, after NYCB was sued by Alexandra Waterbury, a former student at SAB, Reichlen spoke on behalf of the dancers at NYCB's fall fashion gala. The speech was written by her and fellow principal dancer Adrian Danchig-Waring. Though she did not name the lawsuit or anyone involved, she noted, "we will not put art before common decency or allow talent to sway our moral compass."

Reichlen retired from ballet in February 2022, following a performance of Balanchine's one act Swan Lake. She will then work as the gallery manager of Shrine, which was founded by her husband.

Selected repertoire
Reichlen's repertoire with the New York City Ballet includes:

Personal life
Reichlen studied biology in Barnard College.

She is married to Scott Ogden. She has a son.

References

American ballerinas
New York City Ballet principal dancers
School of American Ballet alumni
Janice Levin Award dancers
1980s births
Living people
Dancers from Virginia
Prima ballerinas
21st-century American ballet dancers
Morphoses dancers
21st-century American women